Punga Mare  is a lake in the north polar region of Titan, the planet Saturn's largest moon. After Kraken Mare and Ligeia Mare, it is the third largest known body of liquid on Titan. It is composed of liquid hydrocarbons (mainly methane and ethane). Located almost adjacent to the north pole at 85.1° N, 339.7° W, it measures roughly 380 km (236 mi) across, greater than the length of Lake Victoria on Earth. Its surface area is ~61,000 km2 (23,522 sq. mi). Its namesake is Punga, in Māori mythology ancestor of sharks, rays and lizards and a son of Tangaroa, the god of the sea.

Notes

References

External links 

 Labelled map of the liquid bodies in the north polar region of Titan

Lakes of Titan (moon)